Spiegel is a surname of German origin. In German language Spiegel means mirror.

Spiegel is an ancient German Christian surname. Family tradition says it was taken from a town or lake named Spiegel. There is a small community south of Munich named Spiegel. The name Spiegel goes back to at least the 12th century, when the Spiegel family were barons of Desenburg and Peckelsheim in Hessen; one noted person was Heinrich III Spiegel zum Desenberg (1361–80), Bishop of Paderborn. 

There are also a significant number of Jewish people with the surname, and it is said that this name originated from a house sign in the Frankfurt am Main (Judengasse) picturing a mirror. The form Spiegel is documented in Frankfurt am Main since the 16th century. Variants are Szpiegel, Schpiegel, Shpi(e)gel, Şpighel, etc. Family lore, as told by the family of Joseph Spiegel scion of the Spiegel Family of catalogue fame, says that the family name in Germany had been Meyer. Big Meyer, bought a large mirror for the house. When he got it home, it was too big to fit. So, it was leaned against a nearby tree. When people came into the valley, the sun reflected off the mirror. The house became known as the Spiegel house. The family adopted the name.

People with the surname Spiegel
 Adam Spiegel aka Spike Jonze (born 1969), American film director
 Arthur Spiegel, Chicago mail-order businessman and early American film studio executive
 David Spiegel (born 1945), son of Herbert Spiegel, American psychiatrist and medical hypnotist
 Edward A. Spiegel (1931–2020), American astrophysicist
 Evan Spiegel (born 1990), American entrepreneur, inventor of Snapchat
 Friedrich (von) Spiegel (1820–1905), an orientalist at the University of Erlangen
 Giora Spiegel (born 1947), a Jewish-Israeli footballer and manager
 Herbert Spiegel (1914–2009), American psychiatrist and medical hypnotist, who treated the woman known as Sybil
 Jacob Spiegel (1902–1984), Justice of the Massachusetts Supreme Judicial Court
 Joseph Spiegel (1840–1918), founder of Spiegel Catalog
 Laurie Spiegel (born 1945), an American composer
 Marcus M. Spiegel (1829–1864), Colonel in the Union Army during the American Civil War
 Samuel Arthur Spiegel (born 1947), American architect
 Paul Spiegel (1937–2006), leader of the Central Council of Jews in Germany
 Sam Spiegel (1901–1985), Polish-born film producer
 Sam Spiegel (musician), American producer/DJ and brother of Spike Jonze
 Sarah Spiegel, American singer
 Tilly Spiegel (1906–1988) European wartime resistance activist and postwar researcher into victims of Nazism

Fictional 
 Spike Spiegel, Bounty hunter, pilot and former member of the Red Dragon Crime Syndicate; a character in Cowboy Bebop

References

See also
 Fritz Spiegl (1926–2003), Austrian-born musician, journalist, broadcaster, humorist and collector
 Spiegle (disambiguation)
 Spiegler
 Spiegelmann

Dutch-language surnames
German-language surnames
Jewish surnames
Yiddish-language surnames
Occupational surnames